Eric Alexander Iloski (born January 21, 1998) is an American soccer player.

Career

Youth 
Iloski spent one season with the  Real Salt Lake Academy in Arizona, scoring 1 goal in 26 matches.

College & Amateur 
In 2017, Iloski attended the University of California, Los Angeles to play college soccer. During his time with the Bruins, Iloski made 55 appearances, including 3 during the 2020 season that was cancelled due to the COVID-19 pandemic, scoring 3 goals and tallying 8 assists. Iloski was named as a All-Pac 12 Honourable Mention in each of his three seasons at UCLA.

Whilst at college, Iloski also played in the USL League Two, spending time with FC Golden State Force in 2018, and Ogden City SC in 2019.

Professional
On January 21, 2021, Iloski was selected 46th overall in the 2021 MLS SuperDraft by Vancouver Whitecaps FC. However, he wasn't signed by the club. On April 5, 2021, it was announced that Iloski had signed with USL Championship side Las Vegas Lights.

Iloski made his professional debut on June 25, 2021, appearing as a 72nd-minute substitute during a 2–1 loss to San Diego Loyal.

Personal
Eric has two brothers, Brian and Milan, who are also professional soccer players.

References

External links

UCLA bio

1998 births
American soccer players
Association football defenders
FC Golden State Force players
Las Vegas Lights FC players
Living people
Ogden City SC players
People from San Diego
Soccer players from California
UCLA Bruins men's soccer players
USL Championship players
USL League Two players
Vancouver Whitecaps FC draft picks